The A. F. R. Building, located at 501 N. Main St. in Pocatello, Idaho, was built in 1903.  Also known as the Roulet Block, it was listed on the National Register of Historic Places in 1990.

It is a two-story building which is rectangular in plan except for a cutaway corner entrance at the corner of Main St. and Wyeth St.  It was deemed significant as "one of Pocatello's few commercial structures—and certainly one of the most intact structures—from the early-twentieth century period."

References

Commercial buildings on the National Register of Historic Places in Idaho
Romanesque Revival architecture in Idaho
Renaissance Revival architecture in Idaho
Buildings and structures completed in 1903
Bannock County, Idaho